Mariathaipuram is a village located in Tenkasi District, Tamilnadu, India.  Mariathaipuram village is located near Vadiyur. Most of the people belonging to Christianity. The people are mainly involved in agricultural activities. The festival of the village falls on August 15 of every year.mariyathaipuram is a Nadar village

Events 
 Mariathaipuram Nadar Festival 
 Mariathaipuram Pongal festival

Weblinks

References 

Villages in Tirunelveli district